is a shoot 'em up video game, the fifth game in the Star Fox series, published by Nintendo for the Nintendo DS in 2006 and 2007. Star Fox Command was announced at the E3 2006 conference, under the name Star Fox DS. Command is the first Star Fox game for a handheld, and supports the Nintendo Wi-Fi Connection, making it the first online Star Fox game. The game was re-released for the Wii U Virtual Console service in 2015.

The game follows Fox McCloud attempting to defend the galaxy from aliens known as the Anglar. Q-Games originally worked on Intersect, which Nintendo decided to turn into a DS game. The game was generally well-received; it has achieved an average score of 76% from GameRankings, a reviews aggregate.

Gameplay

The game has two types of single-player gameplay including a strategic map and battle mode. The overworld-like map mode is where the player takes command of several ships. The mode is used to get ships into the battle mode and is essentially a simple turn-based strategy game. Up to four ships can be maneuvered at a time. The object of the mode is to prevent the enemy ones from reaching the Great Fox. It also allows players to fire missiles from the Great Fox that they have picked up from exploring in this mode, or from meeting certain conditions in the battle mode (usually destroying all enemies). When a craft that is controlled by the player encounters an enemy group or missile in this mode, the gameplay switches to the battle mode.

Battle mode is similar to the "all-range mode" employed in Star Fox 64 for some bosses and levels. Like the cancelled Star Fox 2 the game is completely all-range, as opposed to the "on-rails" levels featured in most other Star Fox games (however, the game will sometimes force the player to engage in classic "chase" missions in order to complete an objective). The usual objectives are to destroy a base ship, destroy all enemies, or collect a number of cores to complete the battle mode. Once the battle mode is completed, the game returns to the map mode. As players progress through the game, they are able to choose to go different routes upon completing certain levels. Each route has its own character dialogue to accompany it, and players are able to visit differing planets depending on what routes they choose. The game features 9 different endings altogether, and gamers can access all of them by playing the game multiple times, selecting different routes each time. Instead of merely giving different perspectives on what happens to the Star Fox team, each ending is unique — the characters go in various directions depending on what ending is watched. Star Fox Command does not feature traditional voice acting. Instead it outputs gibberish akin to the "voices" in Star Fox for the SNES, or the "Lylat speech" present in Lylat Wars. Players can also record their own voices into the game's "gibberish generator" using the built-in DS microphone where it is converted into the garbled speech of the various characters.

Multiplayer 
Star Fox Command supports six players in local wireless multiplayer matches via DS Download Play and up to three players on the Nintendo Wi-Fi Connection. In Nintendo Wi-Fi Connection matches, only the Arwing II is available. Players score not by killing opponents, but by collecting stars from them when they have been destroyed. It is also possible to collect a star from an opponent not killed by the player. This is a modified version of the mode from Star Fox 64/Lylat Wars. Nintendo Wi-Fi uses a ranking system based on rankings of the alphabet with Z being the lowest and A being the highest. Players work their way up from Z by collecting wins (they could be based on points). For every win a player gains a certain amount of percentage and once they reach 100% they move to the next letter. The highest rank a player can get is 100% of the A rank.

Plot and setting

Setting and characters

The game is set in the Lylat system, using a similar map as Star Fox 64 to switch between each areas. However, two planets, Zoness and Macbeth, did not appear in the game, unlike Star Fox 64. Command has the largest number of playable characters in any Star Fox game, with a total of fourteen, including Fox McCloud, Falco Lombardi, Krystal, Slippy Toad, Peppy Hare, Wolf O'Donnell, Panther Caroso, Leon Powalski, Slippy's fiancée Amanda, Peppy's daughter Lucy Hare, Bill Grey, Katt Monroe, Andross' grandson Dash Bowman and James McCloud.Andrew Oikonny is one of the game's bosses. Slippy's father Beltino Toad makes an appearance during a mission briefing. ROB 64 is not playable, but pilots the Great Fox when on the map screen. Pigma Dengar appears as a boss in two of Falco's stories. The ghost of Andross, possessing a different bioweapon (Monarch Dodra, Grunner, Killer Bee, or Dune Worm) depending on the mission, appears as a boss on Titania. Octoman, an F-Zero racer, appears as a boss in certain Aquas and Venom missions.

Story
The planet Venom's forces were all but destroyed, and there is thought to be peace. This is not to be, however, as a race of beings known as the Anglar rise from the acidic oceans of Venom, thought to be unable to support life. The Anglar Emperor plans on destroying the Lylat system, which Fox McCloud and crew set out to save. The Star Fox team has broken up, but re-assembles to fight the threat. Peppy is made the General of the Cornerian Army, replacing Pepper. Fox flew around the Lylat system with ROB on patrol, and Krystal broke off her relationship with Fox after she left the team, because he was afraid she would get injured and it would affect him. Slippy finds love with a frog named Amanda, and spends less time with the team. Falco left the team and went around on solo missions (as he has done before in Star Fox Adventures), spending less time with the team also. Peppy's daughter Lucy joins the team for some missions. There are nine endings depending on paths chosen by the player, though the player is required to finish the game before having the options.

Dylan Cuthbert and Takaya Imamura stated in an interview with IGN that if this storyline was continued, it would begin in the middle of Star Fox Command. On Reddit Cuthbert stated that "canon is something the fans like to try to follow but Command was meant to be an alternate timeline kind of game, hence the choices you make. It let us have a lot more fun with the characters".

Development
Star Fox Command was co-developed by Q-Games and directed by its founder, Dylan Cuthbert, who previously served as a lead programmer of the original Star Fox duology. Q-Games was working on a puzzle game called Digidrive for Nintendo when they were approached to do a mock-up of the game demo. After three months, using the original Star Fox, it was shown to Takaya Imamura at Nintendo who said that the company would redesign it for better compatibility with the Nintendo DS and add some ideas from Star Fox 2. Nintendo EAD was responsible for the music and production of the game, while Q-Games handled the main development. The game was re-released for Wii U Virtual Console worldwide in June and August 2015.

Reception

Star Fox Command debuted on the Japanese best seller list as number 14, selling over 20,000 copies on the first day. In the United States, it was the 5th best seller in the first week. Star Fox Command has received mostly positive reviews, with a Metacritic score of 76/100 and a GameRankings score of 76%. IGN gave it an 8 out of 10, or "Impressive", calling it a "surprisingly rich and faithful action game" that had similar game play to Star Fox and Star Fox 64. Star Fox Command received IGN DS's August 2006 Game of the Month Award for capturing the fun and essence that made the series significant. Famitsu gave a 32/40, and was cited as an influence for the game's large initial sales. It received a 4 out of 5 star rating on G4's X-Play, praising the stylus control and the strategy elements. The Associated Press noted the game for having developed the game to work well with the DS controls, but had mixed feelings about the turn-based sections of gameplay. Electronic Gaming Monthly claimed that while the game has its own charm, it lacks the original gameplay from Star Fox and Star Fox 64 and becomes repetitive. UK website Mansized gave Command a three out of five stars. Command was nominated in three categories in Nintendo Power's annual vote-in awards, although it did not win in any of them. Star Fox Command has also received an 8 from Game Informer magazine. Although it was criticized for its brevity, the game was lauded for its solid gameplay mechanics.

Notes

References

External links

 Star Fox Command  
Star Fox Command 
 
 
 

2006 video games
Multiplayer and single-player video games
Multiplayer online games
Nintendo DS games
Nintendo Wi-Fi Connection games
Q-Games games
Command
Turn-based strategy video games
Video games developed in Japan
Video games with alternate endings
Virtual Console games for Wii U
Virtual Console games